Abu Bakarr Fofanah is a Sierra Leonean politician who has been Minister of Health and Sanitation in the Cabinet of Sierra Leone since 2014. He was previously a lecturer at the College of Medicine and Allied Health Sciences in Sierra Leone.

References

Year of birth missing (living people)
Living people
Health ministers of Sierra Leone